The Salt Fork of the Arkansas River is a  tributary of the Arkansas River in southern Kansas and northern Oklahoma in the United States.  Via the Arkansas River, it is part of the watershed of the Mississippi River.

Course

The Salt Fork rises in Comanche County, Kansas, and flows initially southeastwardly through Barber County, Kansas, and Woods County, Oklahoma, to the town of Alva, where it turns eastwardly for the remainder of its course through Alfalfa, Grant, Kay and Noble counties in Oklahoma, past the towns of Pond Creek, Lamont and Tonkawa.

In Alfalfa County, a dam on the river impounds Great Salt Plains Lake, which is lined with salt flats and is the site of Salt Plains National Wildlife Refuge and a state park.

The Salt Fork's largest tributaries are the Medicine Lodge River, which joins it in Alfalfa County, and the Chikaskia River, which joins it in Kay County.

Variant names
According to the Geographic Names Information System, the Salt Fork Arkansas River has also been known as:

See also
List of Kansas rivers
List of Oklahoma rivers

References

Columbia Gazetteer of North America entry
DeLorme (2003).  Kansas Atlas & Gazetteer.  Yarmouth, Maine: DeLorme.  .
DeLorme (2003).  Oklahoma Atlas & Gazetteer.  Yarmouth, Maine: DeLorme.  .

Rivers of Kansas
Rivers of Oklahoma
Rivers of Alfalfa County, Oklahoma
Rivers of Barber County, Kansas
Rivers of Comanche County, Kansas
Rivers of Grant County, Oklahoma
Rivers of Kay County, Oklahoma
Rivers of Noble County, Oklahoma
Rivers of Woods County, Oklahoma
Tributaries of the Arkansas River